The Kane Area School District is a small, rural, public school district in southwestern McKean County and in parts of Elk County in northwestern Pennsylvania, United States, in the middle of the Allegheny National Forest.

The district serves: Hamilton Township, Highland Township, Jones Township, Kane, Ludlow - Mount Jewett, Wetmore Township and James City. According to 2010 federal census data, it serves a resident population of 7,436. Per the US Census Bureau in 2000, it served a resident population of 8,152 people. The educational attainment levels for the School District population (25 years old and over) were 87% high school graduates and 14% college graduates.

In 2009, the district residents’ per capita income was $16,573, while the median family income was $39,826. In the Commonwealth, the median family income was $49,501  and the United States median family income was $49,445, in 2010.  In McKean County, the median household income was $41,351. By 2013, the median household income in the United States rose to $52,100.

Schools
The Kane Area School District operates three schools: Kane Area Elementary School (K-5), Kane Area Middle School (6-8) and Kane Area High School (9-12).

Extracurricular activities
Kane Area School District has many varsity and junior varsity sports.  All athletic contests are under the jurisdiction of the Pennsylvania Interscholastic Athletic Association rules and regulations for that particular sport.

There are also a variety of non-athletic activities available to students throughout the district.

The Kane Wolves won the Allegheny Mountain League football championship in November, 2007 and were 10-0 for the season.  It was the first 10-win season in Kane history.  The team's football coach—Jason Barner—was named AML Coach-of-the-Year.

Kane's first undefeated football team completed the 1963 season a perfect 9–0.

Kane won the 1949 Class B state championship in boys basketball.

The boys' soccer team won 5 consecutive UAVSL League Championships from 2002–2006 and the 2003 District IX championship. That team advanced into the PIAA Quarterfinals in the state tournament.

Notable people

Chuck Daly, basketball coach
Amy Rudolph, Olympic runner

References

External links

School districts in Elk County, Pennsylvania
School districts in McKean County, Pennsylvania